The Musi River is a river in Southern Sumatra, Indonesia. It flows from south-west to north-east, from the Barisan Mountains range that form the backbone of Sumatra, in Kepahiang Regency, Bengkulu Province, to the Bangka Strait that forms an extension of the South China Sea. It is about 750 kilometers long, and drains most of South Sumatra province. After flowing through Palembang, the provincial capital, it joins with several other rivers, including the Banyuasin River, to form a delta near the town of Sungsang. The river, dredged to a depth of about 6.5 meters, is navigable by large ships as far as Palembang, which is the site of major port facilities used primarily for the export of petroleum, rubber and palm oil.

This river system, especially around the city of Palembang, was the heart of eponymous 7th to 13th century Srivijayan empire.
The river mouth was the site of the SilkAir Flight 185 plane crash which killed all 104 passengers and crew on board in 1997.

Geography
The river flows in the southern area of Sumatra with a predominantly tropical rainforest climate (designated as Af in the Köppen-Geiger climate classification). The annual average temperature in the area is 24 °C. The warmest month is July, when the average temperature is around 26 °C, and the coldest is February, at 22 °C. The average annual rainfall is 2579 mm. The wettest month is April, with an average of 344 mm rainfall, and the driest is September, with 99 mm rainfall.

Gallery

See also
List of rivers of Indonesia
List of rivers of Sumatra

References

External links

Banyuasin Musi River Delta conservation information from the ARCBC

Rivers of South Sumatra
Rivers of Indonesia